The 2005 Arena Football League season was the 19th season of the Arena Football League. The league champions were the Colorado Crush, who defeated the Georgia Force in ArenaBowl XIX. The AFL changed its playoff format to allow the top four teams per conference to make the playoffs. Previously, the top eight teams in the league make the playoffs, regardless of their conference. Also, there was no inter-conference play in the playoffs until the Arena Bowl starting in 2005. The division champions also received an automatic playoff berth. This was probably brought on by the fact that the year before the Eastern Division champion New York Dragons missed the playoffs.

Standings

 Green indicates clinched playoff berth
 Purple indicates division champion
 Grey indicates best conference record

Playoffs
All games televised by NBC.

All-Arena team

References